Addlove is a Chinese bakery chain, with headquarters in Deyang, Sichuan and offices in Chengdu and Mianyang.

It was established in September 1996. As of 2009 it had over 70 restaurants. It formerly had the English name Adina.

References

External links

 Addlove 
 "以成都为“跳板”向外扩张" (Archive). Sichuan Daily. February 20, 2014.
 "徳阳市工商联会员企业“爱达乐”用爱打造百年老店" (Archive). Sichuan Provincial General Chamber of Commerce (四川省工商业联合会). November 13, 2012.
Food and drink companies established in 1996
1996 establishments in China
Bakeries
Deyang
Food and drink companies of China